Arctowski may refer to:

 Henryk Arctowski (1871–1958), Polish scientist and explorer
 Arctowski Medal
 Arctowski Dome
 Arctowski Cove
 Arctowski Peninsula
 Arctowski Nunatak
 Arctowski Peak
 Henryk Arctowski Polish Antarctic Station